Nieuwediep may refer to:

Nieuwediep, Netherlands, village in Drenthe, Netherlands
Nieuwediep (river), canal near Den Helder, North Holland